Day Watch may refer to:

 Day Watch (novel), a fantasy novel by Russian authors Sergey Lukyanenko and Vladimir Vasilyev
 Day Watch (video game), a 2007 tactical role-playing game
 Day Watch (film), a 2006 Russian dark fantasy action film